Can't Pay? We'll Take It Away! is a British factual documentary series on Channel 5. It follows the work of High Court enforcement officers (previously known as sheriffs) as they execute privately obtained High Court writs across England and Wales on behalf of private clients, on those who have failed to make repayments on alleged debts or refuse to vacate a property. The series was first broadcast on 24 February 2014. In series 1 and 2 the show featured High Court enforcement agents (HCEAs) from a private limited company called High Court Solutions. The subsequent series featured HCEAs from Direct Collection Bailiffs Ltd (DCBL). Five series of the programme have been broadcast to date.

Production
The series has been broadcast Channel 5 since 24 February 2014. Their brief of the series says: "With exclusive access to some of the most experienced HCEAs and Repossession Teams in the country, this series is an eye-opening insight into cash-strapped Britain from the perspectives of debtors, creditors and debt collectors.

"Produced by Brinkworth Films, the series and its various spin-offs reveal what it means to be a creditor who cannot get back what they are owed, what it is like to be saddled with debt that you are simply unable to repay, and what it takes to be the kind of person who can pay but refuses to do so. Cameras capture the daily hassle of dealing with violent confrontations, tearful debtors, downright liars and genuine cases of hardship. Then there are the debtors, many of whom have some distressing tales to tell of how they got into the situation in the first place. No one wants their possessions confiscated, after all. The result is a unique insight into one of the biggest issues facing those who cannot afford to keep paying the bills."

Episodes

Series 1 (2014)
The first series introduces five initial cast members: Paul Bohill, Steve Pinner, Mike Allonby, Terry Jones and Steve Wood. The day after the broadcast of the first programme, Allonby died aged 47 at his home in Wales. Both Jones and Wood subsequently only appeared in the first series, with Bohill and Pinner (High Court Solutions) the only two cast members who went on to appear in series two. The first three episodes became the most watched programme on the channel that week, with episodes four and five placing at second and third, respectively.

Series 2 (2014)
The second series again featured High Court Solutions Paul Bohill, Steve Pinner, the only two returning cast members from the first series. Appearing for the first time was Steve's son, Ben Pinner and new HCEA's from DCBL. Every episode of the series ranked in the top three most watched programmes on the channel that week.

Series 3 (2015)
Cast member Kevin Stokes confirmed on Twitter that the returning cast for the third series was as follows: Paul Bohill, Steve Pinner, Ben Pinner, Stewart McCracken, Iain Taylor and Brian O'Shaughnessy. New cast members in this series would include: himself, Delroy Anglin ("Del"), Elmor Victor ("Vic") and Phil Short, who previously appeared in a non-speaking role in series two. Graham Aldred was confirmed as the only cast member from series two to not be returning for the third series. Every episode in series three placed within the top four most-watched programmes on Channel 5 for each respective week. For eight non-consecutive weeks, it was the most watched programme on the channel. Episode 12 had previously been broadcast on 4 August, as part of the "Britain on Benefits" season.

Series 4A (2016)
In February 2016, cast member Paul Bohill confirmed on Twitter that the cast for the fourth series was as follows: himself, Steve Pinner, Ben Pinner, Stewart McCracken, Iain Taylor, Brian O'Shaughnessy, Delroy Anglin ("Del") and Elmor Victor ("Vic"). The only agent not to return from the third series was Kevin Stokes. Additionally, three further agents appeared in minor roles: Phil Short, Ru Pabari and Alan Hunt, all of whom featured in one episode each. The series was filmed between September and November 2015. Broadcast was later confirmed for 13 April 2016. Additionally, the scheduling for several episodes was changed at the last minute: episode 4 was due to air on 4 May, but for reasons unknown was held over and not broadcast until the end of the series, later subtitled the "Busted" special. The broadcast of episodes 7 & 8 was also switched for reasons unknown.

Series 4B (2016)
Broadcast of fourth series continued after a summer break, and the transmission date was confirmed on 18 August 2016. DCBL subsequently added a page on their website with profiles of each of the agents featured in the series. The cast for the second half of the series remains unchanged, with Bohill, Steve Pinner, Ben Pinner, McCracken, Taylor, O'Shaughnessy, Anglin and Victor all returning. This half-series sees the introduction of one new agent, Dael Anglin, Delroy's son. On 5 October 2016 two further new agents were introduced into the series, Gareth Short and Craig Vernall. Episode 8 also saw a guest appearance from Graham Aldred, last seen in series two. Phil Short also guest starred in Episode 9. O'Shaughnessy has since confirmed on Twitter that this series will be his last. The series began filming in February 2016. This half-series featured sixteen episodes.

Series 5 (2017–2018)
A fifth series was confirmed for broadcast shortly after the end of series four. In this series, six new regular agents are introduced: Gary Brown, Garry Ball, Matthew Heighway, Cona Jackson, Mitchell Starr and Max Carracher. Agent Aron Graves also appears as a recurring member of the cast. Returning cast members for this series include Paul Bohill, Steve Pinner, Ben Pinner, Stewart McCracken, Elmor Victor, Iain Taylor and Gareth Short, who made his debut appearance in the last series. Delroy Anglin also guest starred in one episode. Brian O'Shaughnessy, Dael Anglin and Craig Vernall will not be returning to the series. 

The Radio Times initially confirmed that this series will contain a total of thirty episodes; however, this subsequently increased to thirty-two; and a further ten episodes were later added to the schedule; bringing the final number of episodes to forty-two. This series was split into three broadcast segments, with the first airing from 22 March 2017, the second airing from 30 August 2017 (with an additional two unplanned episodes broadcasting from 8 November 2017, replacing a planned broadcast of Big Family Values), and the third set to be broadcast in 2018.

Complaints 
Several episodes of the programme have been assessed by broadcasting regulator Ofcom after complaints. In 2015, Ofcom considered three complaints by individuals featured during the first series. In its decisions, the agency found that the complainants had not been subject to an unwarranted infringement of privacy despite being filmed both by body cameras and by regular cameras.

However, Ofcom reversed its 2017 decision after receiving supplemental information that the body cameras used by the enforcement agents came from the programme makers, not their employers (thus negating the argument that they were used for health and safety purposes). As the complainant in that case had not been informed that the footage would be broadcast, Ofcom found that there had been an unwarranted infringement of privacy. Ofcom has since found similar breaches in other episodes of Can't Pay? We'll Take It Away!, including in syndicated episodes from earlier series.

In February 2018, a couple whose eviction was shown during an episode of series 3 successfully sued Channel 5 for damages. The High Court of Appeals awarded the two £20,000 after finding that their privacy had been infringed. It was replaced by Channel 5 for a different type of show called, Call The Bailiffs: Time To Pay Up, which debuted on 19 July 2021.

See also
 The Sheriffs Are Coming

References

External links
 Can't Pay? We'll Take It Away! (Channel 5)
 Can't Pay? We'll Take It Away! (My5)
 
 Can't Pay? We'll Take It Away! at Radio Times
 Can't Pay? We'll Take It Away! at Netflix

2014 British television series debuts
2018 British television series endings
Channel 5 (British TV channel) reality television shows
2010s British reality television series
English-language television shows
2010s British documentary television series
Television controversies in the United Kingdom